Heizmannia (Heizmannia) carteri is a species complex of zoophilic mosquito belonging to the genus Heizmannia. It is endemic to Sri Lanka.

References

carteri